W. Stanley Wadlow (December 25, 1903 – July 27, 1989) was an alderman for East York, Ontario, served as the borough's commissioner of Parks and Recreation, and a former soccer player.

Military and Soccer career  
Wadlow served as a Lieutenant with the Royal Canadian Navy during World War II. He also enjoyed a lengthy career in playing soccer, where he initially began playing in 1917 with the Bolton avenue school team. In 1923, he played in the Inter-City League with Caledonians F.C., and then played in the Senior First Division with Mimico Beach in 1926. In 1929, he played in the National Soccer League with Toronto Maple Leafs. In 1931, he played with Toronto CNR, and later with Toronto Ulster United in 1932. He returned to the Maple Leafs in 1933, where he served as team captain and received the Noble Garrett trophy. In 1938, he was transferred to Toronto Scottish where he retired in 1942.

Politics 
After his soccer career he became involved in East York's public services as a recreation director. In 1961, he contributed in the construction of the East York Recreation Community Centre, which later was renamed in his honor. In 1965, he was named deputy commissioner of Parks and Recreation for East York. In 1971, he retired from his duties as commissioner of Parks and Recreation and was elected to East York's council in 1972 as an alderman for Ward 1. In 1985, he was elected as the vice chairman for East York's Hydro commission and retired in early 1989.

Personal life 
He was married to Lillian French and had two sons Donald and George. He was a member of the United Church of Canada as a lay preacher. He died on July 27, 1989 after a lengthy illness in East York.

References  

1903 births
1989 deaths
Canadian soccer players
Royal Canadian Navy officers
Toronto Ulster United players
Toronto Scottish players
Canadian National Soccer League players
Soccer players from Toronto
Metropolitan Toronto councillors
People from East York, Toronto
Ontario municipal councillors
Canadian Christians
Association football midfielders